The Lion Capital Series were a series of currency notes issued after India declared its independence from Great Britain and used until the Reserve Bank of India (RBI) introduced the Mahatma Gandhi Series in 1996 with banknotes in denominations of 10 and 500 rupees, and were designed with the image of the Lion Capital of Ashoka, the National Emblem which replaced the George VI banknote series. The first banknotes printed after India achieved its independence was a 1-rupee note.

Lion Capital Series Banknotes I

Lion Capital Series Banknotes II

Gallery

See also

Indian rupee
Mahatma Gandhi Series
Mahatma Gandhi New Series

References 

Banknotes of India
Portraits on banknotes
Lions in popular culture